The Cannes International Series Festival, usually called the Canneseries, is an international television festival held annually in Cannes, France. The festival aims to showcase and promote television series from around the world. The festival is usually held parallel to MIPTV Media Market.

History
In 2014, the Mayor of Cannes, David Lisnard supported the idea of an international television festival held in the city.

In 2017, former French Minister of Culture Fleur Pellerin was appointed as the festival president and Benoît Louvet as the general manager. In June 2017, the first edition of Canneseries was announced to be held in April 2018.

Edition

Festival programme
As of 2023, the festival is composed of four different sections:
Competition
Short Form Competition
Documentary Series Competition
Out of Competition

Awards
As of 2022, the categories presented at the festival were:
Best Series
Grand Prize
Best Screenplay
Special Award for Best Cast Performance
Best Performance
Best Music
Best Short Form Series
Revelation Award
High School Award for Best Series
Student Award for Best Short Form Series

Special awards

Variety Icon Award
The award, presented by American magazine Variety, recognizes outstanding achievement in acting which garners praise from critics and audience.
2018: Michelle Dockery
2019: Diana Rigg
2020: Judith Light
2021: Connie Britton
2022: Gillian Anderson

Madame Figaro Rising Star Award
The award, presented by French magazine Madame Figaro, recognizes a young actress for her promising career.
2020: Daisy Edgar-Jones
2021: Phoebe Dynevor
2022: Sydney Sweeney

Konbini Prix de l'Engagement
The award, presented by French website Konbini, recognizes a talent or a series that has distinguished itself by the artistic quality and the societal, innovative or revolutionary dimension of its work.
2021: Laurie Nunn
2022: Skam France

See also
List of television festivals

References

External links

IMDB festival page for historical awards data

Television festivals
Festivals established in 2018
Awards established in 2018
2018 establishments in France